Paruthippara or Kodampuzha is a small village near Feroke in Kozhikode District. The village is considered an industrial belt as a large number of small-scale are established here for a long time.

Location
Paruthippara is located on a side street between Feroke Pettah and Farook College campus. The villages of Paruthippara and Kodampuzha are on the bank of river Chaliyar.

Muslim Cultural Center
Paruthippara is considered a Muslim cultural center because of the presence of a large number of Madrassas and Arabic Colleges in this region.

Important Organizations  
 Darul Ma'arif Islamic Centre, Kodampuzha Darul Maarif Madrassa( Founded by Kodampuzha Bava Musliyar)
 Farook College
 Irashadhiya College, Thumbappadam
 Masjidhul Hudha, Koadampuzha
 Al-Manar Islamic Center, Kodampuzha
 Nest Public School
 Paruthippara Library
 Muslim Orphanage, Kodampuzha
KMO residential English School (CBSE)
 GMLP School, Karinkallai

Villages and Suburbs
 Chandakkada, Petta, Kodampuzha and Kallivalavu
 Melepara, Kodakaparamba and Karinkallay

Transportation
The nearest railway station is Feroke. There is an airport at Kondotty. Buses are available from Feroke Pettah and Ramanattukara. 
Bus Timings
There are so many busses naming, ABCD, KARINTHANDAN, KISMATH, BISMILLAH ( SHUTTLE SERVICE BETWEEN FEROKE -PARUTHIPPARA -RAMANATTUKARA)
and also city buses from Paruthippara to Calicut city. bus services are starting from morning 6:30 to night 10:00.
timings of buses to Paruthippara from Ramanattukara

7:20 to every 15–20 minutes interval
timings of buses to Paruthippara from Feroke
07:00 am to every 10 minutes interval

The Village Paruthippara is famous for MOITHAKKANTE PEEDYELE MUNTHIRI SIP-UP മൊയ്തുക്കന്റെ പീടിയേലെ മുന്തിരി സിപ് അപ്പ് ( GRAPE SIP UP OF MOIDHU'S SHOP)
THE FISH STALL OF PARUTHIPPARA IS THE POINT FOR THE PEOPLE FROM KODAMPUZHA TO FAROOK COLLEGE

See also
 Kadalundi Bird Sanctuary
 Farook College
 Ramanattukara
 Vallikkunnu
 Feroke
 Chelari
 Tenhipalam
 Chelembra

References

Villages in Kozhikode district
Kozhikode south